The Via Vinci University, short for “the International University for Creative Leadership and Entrepreneurship”, was intended as an international, Netherlands based private university. The name was used in 2000, it now operates under the name of Via Vinci Academy after scrutiny from the Dutch government. It starting using the name in 2007 when the parent institutes IMAGO Group and the International University of Entrepreneurship merged. The name “Via Vinci” refers to "the way" of Leonardo da Vinci, the icon of universal, innovative and creative strength.

Via Vinci University also hosts the Leonardo Society, a network of companies, students and alumni. The network publishes the Leonardo magazine. No information on this initiative is currently available via internet.

Via Vinci University tried to offer programs at the post-graduate, master, and PhD levels. Currently it educates over 700 students, who combine their studies with a day job. Furthermore, they claim that applied research is being conducted and projects are being carried out, focusing on the development of companies, regions, and sectors.

The former "university" claims to be currently active in four countries, working from her branches in the Netherlands (Breda and Bergen op Zoom), Suriname (Paramaribo), Russia (Rostov and Taganrog) and Aruba.

Via Vinci University has been accredited and certified by the International Association of Science Parks, the "Stichting Post-HBO" for her post-graduate courses, "Cedeo" for her tailor-made courses, and the Dutch school leader’s academy "NSA" for her courses in the field of educational management. Several programmes are currently being assessed by the Dutch-Flemish Accreditation Organisation "NVAO". The Via Vinci University is not recognized by the Dutch Department of Education, Culture and Science. Dutch Education Secretary Marja van Bijsterveldt was displeased that this university is free to use the name "University" and she pressed for law changes, in order to protect the use of the names "Universiteit" and "Hogeschool".

External links

References

Universities in the Netherlands
Business schools in the Netherlands
2000 establishments in the Netherlands
Educational institutions established in 2000